Jonah James Bayliss (born August 13, 1980) is an American former professional baseball relief pitcher. He is an alumnus of Trinity College in Hartford, Connecticut, and Lawrence Academy at Groton in Groton, Massachusetts.

Career

Kansas City Royals
Bayliss pitched 11 innings in relief for the Royals that year.

Pittsburgh Pirates
He and minor league reliever Chad Blackwell were traded to the Pittsburgh Pirates for starting pitcher Mark Redman on December 7.

On March 28, the Pittsburgh Pirates designated Bayliss for assignment. According to Pirates manager Neal Huntington, "Bayliss is the type of player that teams should be looking for on the waiver wire. He has good stuff, but has struggled with control. If he can figure that out, he can be a very solid reliever."

Toronto Blue Jays
On June 19, 2008, Bayliss was traded by the Pirates to the Toronto Blue Jays. He became a free agent at the end of the season and re-signed with Toronto in February .

Bayliss did not make the Toronto Blue Jays 40-man roster and started the 2009 season with the Triple A Las Vegas 51s.

Saitma Seibu Lions
On July 28, 2009, Bayliss was released by the  Blue Jays so that he could sign with The Saitama Seibu Lions of the Japan Pacific League.

Houston Astros
On February 1, 2010, Bayliss was re-signed as a free agent by the Blue Jays. but he was released on March 31 and subsequently signed by the Houston Astros. He played for Triple-A Round Rock in 2010, and posted a 3.58 ERA.

Tampa Bay Rays
On December 15, 2010, Bayliss got out of Free Agency and the Tampa Bay Rays inked him to a minor league deal. The Rays released him on March 24, 2011.

Atlantic League
He joined the Atlantic League of Professional Baseball with the Lancaster Barnstormers for 2011 season and the Bridgeport Bluefish for 2012.

After Baseball
Jonah is currently a personal pitching coach and owner at the A1 pitching academy in Adams, MA.

Bayliss currently serves as the North Adams SteepleCats general manager and pitching coach.

References

External links

1980 births
Living people
Kansas City Royals players
Pittsburgh Pirates players
Saitama Seibu Lions players
Spokane Indians players
Wichita Wranglers players
Wilmington Blue Rocks players
Indianapolis Indians players
Syracuse Chiefs players
Las Vegas 51s players
Round Rock Express players
Scottsdale Scorpions players
Lancaster Barnstormers players
Bridgeport Bluefish players
Major League Baseball pitchers
Trinity Bantams baseball players
Baseball players from Massachusetts
People from North Adams, Massachusetts
Sportspeople from Berkshire County, Massachusetts